Elisa Johanna Lucie Schlott (born 7 February 1994 in Berlin) is a German actress. Her younger half-sisters are the actresses Emilia Pieske and Helena Pieske.

Life 
Schlott starred in her first television productions as a teenager alongside Ulrich Mühe and Corinna Harfouch. This was followed by her first feature films, and she received the Förderpreis Deutscher Film for the lead role in Draußen am See.

After graduating from high school, Elisa Schlott moved from Berlin to London for a year in October 2012 to take some acting courses. From 2014 she studied acting at the Hochschule für Musik und Theater "Felix Mendelssohn Bartholdy" Leipzig, which she completed in 2017. In 2015, she gained a lot of attention with her portrayal of a drug addict in Tatort: Borowski und der Himmel über Kiel. In 2017, she starred in the film Fremde Tochter, which was awarded the Golden Beaver at the Biberach Film Festival. In 2019, she was in front of the camera for the ARD multi-part series Unsere wunderbaren Jahre, which aired on Das Erste in March 2020, alongside Katja Riemann, Anna Maria Mühe, David Schütter, Franz Hartwig and Ludwig Trepte.

Between 2016 and 2018, she was working with Schauspiel Köln.

Schlott lives in Berlin.

Filmography

Film 
 2007: Die Frau vom Checkpoint Charlie
 2008: Draußen am See (directed by Felix Fuchssteiner)
 2009: Giulias Verschwinden (directed by Christoph Schaub)
 2011: Fliegende Fische müssen ins Meer (directed by Güzin Kar)
 2011: Finn und der Weg zum Himmel (directed by Steffen Weinert)
 2012: The Weekend (directed by Nina Grosse)
 2013:  (directed by Gregor Schnitzler)
 2014: Agnieszka (directed by Tomasz Emil Rudzik)
 2015: Bienenjunge & Blumenmädchen (directed by Clemens Roth)
 2016: La Cigale et la Fourmi (directed by Julia Ritschel)
 2017: Fremde Tochter (directed by Stephan Lacant)
 2018: Safari – Match Me If You Can (directed by Rudi Gaul)
 2019: Goliath 96 (directed by Marcus Richard)
 2019: Limbo (directed by Tim Dünschede)
 2020: Narziss und Goldmund  (directed by Stefan Ruzowitzky)

Television 
 2006: Das Geheimnis von St. Ambrose (directed by Michael Wenning)
 2007: Die Frau vom Checkpoint Charlie (directed by Miguel Alexandre)
 2008: Der große Tom (directed by Nikolaus Stein von Kamienski)
 2008: Polizeiruf 110 – Geliebter Mörder (directed by Christiane Balthasar)
 2011:  (directed by Dominik Graf)
 2013: Nichts mehr wie vorher (directed by Oliver Dommenget)
 2014: Tatort – Borowski und der Himmel über Kiel (directed by Christian Schwochow)
 2015: Marie Brand und der schöne Schein (directed by Jörg Lühdorff)
 2017: Das Verschwinden (directed by Hans-Christian Schmid)
 2018: Der Richter (directed by Markus Imboden)
 2019: Tödliches Comeback (directed by Hermine Huntgeburth)
 2019: Schuld nach Ferdinand von Schirach – Einsam (directed by Nils Willbrandt)
 2020: Unsere wunderbaren Jahre (directed by )
 2021: Ostfriesenangst (directed by Hannu Salonen)
 2022: The Empress

Theater (selection) 
 2003: Der Idiot, Volksbühne Berlin
 2013: Oleanna, Hamburger Kammerspiele

Awards 
 2009: German Film Promotion Award in the category "Acting Female" for Draußen am See
 2015: Günter Strack Television Award for best young actress
 2018: Television Film Award of the German Academy of the Performing Arts, Actor Award for Fremde Tochter

References

External links 

 
 Elisa Schlott at filmportal.de

1994 births
Living people
21st-century German actresses